Tropidonophis hypomelas, the Bismarck keelback, is a species of colubrid snake. It is found in Papua New Guinea.

References

Tropidonophis
Reptiles of Papua New Guinea
Reptiles described in 1877
Taxa named by Albert Günther